People's Council could refer to:
 People's Council of America for Democracy and the Terms of Peace, an American pacifist organization from 1917 to 1919
 People's Council of Donetsk, legislature of the unrecognised Donetsk People's Republic
 People's Council of Latvia, a temporary parliament in the newly independent Latvia from 1918 to 1920
 People's Council of Luhansk, legislature of the unrecognised Luhansk People's Republic
 People's Council of Syria
 People's Council of Turkmenistan

See also
 Volksraad (disambiguation), Afrikaans and Dutch for People's Council